Dicerca lepida, the embossed hawthorn buprestid, is a species of metallic wood-boring beetle in the family Buprestidae.It is found in North America and varies in size between 13.5mm and 17.5mm.

References

Further reading

 
 
 
 
 
 

Buprestidae
Beetles of North America
Beetles described in 1857
Taxa named by John Lawrence LeConte